Ng'ando is a neighbourhood in Dagoretti in the city of Nairobi.

Overview
It is straddles the Ngong Road to the north. It borders Riruta to the north and the Ngong Racecourse to the south.

Ngando is predominantly a low-income neighbourhood that forms part of the larger Dagoretti area. Ngando suffers from poor infrastructure characterised by poor waste disposal, open sewers and unpaved roads. 

Ngando Ward is also an electoral division within Dagoretti South Constituency. The whole constituency is within Dagoretti Sub-county.

References

 

Suburbs of Nairobi